Kamraniyeh-ye Bala (also Romanized as Kāmrānīyeh-ye Bālā; also known as Kāmrānīyeh) is a village in Azizabad Rural District, in the Central District of Narmashir County, Kerman Province, Iran. At the 2006 census, its population was 305, in 73 families.

References 

Populated places in Narmashir County